Seymour Commercial Historic District is a national historic district located at Seymour, Jackson County, Indiana.  It encompasses 79 contributing buildings and 4 contributing structures in the central business district of Seymour.  The district developed between about 1876 and 1945, and includes notable examples of Italianate, Romanesque Revival, and Classical Revival style architecture. Located in the district is the separately listed Farmers Club.  Other notable buildings include the Masonic Temple (1901), Richart Block (1900), Steinker Meat Market (c. 1885), Seymour National Bank (c. 1920), Southern Indiana Telephone and Telegraph Building (1929), Jonas Hotel (c 1876), and Kidd Saloon (1887).

It was listed on the National Register of Historic Places in 1995.

References

Historic districts on the National Register of Historic Places in Indiana
Italianate architecture in Indiana
Romanesque Revival architecture in Indiana
Neoclassical architecture in Indiana
Buildings and structures in Jackson County, Indiana
National Register of Historic Places in Jackson County, Indiana